USS Provo Victory (AK-228) was a  acquired by the U.S. Navy during World War II.  She served in the Pacific Ocean theatre of operations through the end of the war, and then returned to the United States for disposal.

Victory built in Richmond, California
Provo Victory (AK–228) was laid down 28 June 1944, by Permanente Metals Corporation #1, Richmond, California, as S.S. Provo Victory (MCV hull 537); launched 9 September 1944; acquired by the Navy 18 October, and commissioned 18 October 1944.

World War II service
Following shakedown off California, Provo Victory (AK–228) reported for duty 8 November 1944. In 1944 she operated at San Francisco, California, in November, and then at Eniwetok, Ulithi, and the Palau Islands from December 1944 into February 1945.

During the remainder of 1945, her cargo duties took her to Guam and Pearl Harbor in March, Seattle, Washington, in April, Ulithi in May, Leyte from June to October, Eniwetok and Seattle in November.

Post-war decommissioning
Decommissioned 10 April 1946, she was returned to the War Shipping Administration at Seattle, Washington, that day, and was struck from the Naval Vessel Register 8 May 1946.

Korean War
She helped with the Hungnam Evacuation with the Military Sea Transportation Service and Merchant Ships participating in Hungnam Korea Redeployment.

References

  
 NavSource Online: Service Ship Photo Archive - AK-228 Provo Victory

 

Boulder Victory-class cargo ships
Ships built in Richmond, California
1944 ships
World War II auxiliary ships of the United States
Suisun Bay Reserve Fleet